Minecraft – Volume Beta is the fifth studio album and second soundtrack album by German electronic musician Daniel Rosenfeld, known by his pseudonym C418. It was digitally released independently on 9 November 2013 as the second instalment of the soundtrack for the video game Minecraft, and has been physically released by record label Ghostly. The album peaked at number 14 on the Billboard Top Dance/Electronic Albums Chart in 2013.

Like the album's predecessor Minecraft – Volume Alpha, Volume Beta comprises most of the music featured in the game, as well as other music included in trailers and instrumentals that were not included in the game's final release.

Composition and release 
In 2011, Rosenfeld released Minecraft – Volume Alpha. For the next release, the artist was again given complete creative control on the soundtrack that would be implemented as part of Minecraft's November 2013 Music Update.

The mostly ambient album has a generally darker tone than its precursor. Rosenfeld admits that the record is "extremely varied", being "much more percussive, melodic, and progressive" than Volume Alpha. The average song on Volume Beta is far longer than its predecessor – at the time of the album's release, it was Rosenfeld's longest ever work.

Volume Beta also contains the music of nine collectable discs within Minecraft. A stark sonic departure from the rest of the soundtrack, these discs often rely on synthesisers and percussion instruments.

In August 2020, record label Ghostly released the first physical versions of the album, in CD and LP formats. The album's artwork features an extremely dark 3D model of a block of grass from Minecraft, surrounded on the edges by a larger black and orange cube. On some vinyl pressings, lenticular printing is used to give depth to the blocks in the image and highlight the inner grass block.

Critical reception 
Online publication Digital Trends praised the album for moving "beyond pieces that are simply 'peaceful' or 'sad' and creates tracks like 'Taswell' and 'Kyoto' that feel like distinct performances". Richard McDonald of music blog Original Sound Version called the album "an amazing achievement". The Los Angeles Times wrote that the album "showcases C418’s ability to make grander, more sonically diverse ambience".

Track listing 

Digital download

 "Ki" – 1:32
 "Alpha" – 10:03
 "Dead Voxel" – 4:56
 "Blind Spots" – 5:32
 "Flake" – 2:50
 "Moog City 2" – 3:00
 "Concrete Halls" – 4:14
 "Biome Fest" – 6:18
 "Mutation" – 3:05
 "Haunt Muskie" – 6:01
 "Warmth" – 3:59
 "Floating Trees" – 4:04
 "Aria Math" – 5:10
 "Kyoto" – 4:09
 "Ballad of the Cats" – 4:35
 "Taswell" – 8:35
 "Beginning 2" – 2:56
 "Dreiton" – 8:17
 "The End" – 15:04
 "Chirp" – 3:06
 "Wait" – 3:54
 "Mellohi" – 1:38
 "Stal" – 2:32
 "Strad" – 3:08
 "Eleven" – 1:11
 "Ward" – 4:10
 "Mall" – 3:18
 "Blocks" – 5:43
 "Far" – 3:12
 "Intro" – 4:36

Duration – 140:48

LP

Side A

 "Ki" – 1:32
 "Alpha" – 10:03
 "Blind Spots" – 5:32
 "Mutation" – 3:05

Side B

 "Biome Fest" – 6:18
 "Aria Math" – 5:10
 "Taswell" – 8:35

Side C

 "Beginning 2" – 2:56
 "Moog City 2" – 3:00
 "The End" – 15:04

Side D

 "Kyoto" – 4:09
 "Chirp" – 3:06
 "Mellohi" – 1:38
 "Stal" – 2:32
 "Eleven" – 1:11
 "Far" – 3:12
 "Intro" – 4:36

Duration – 81:39Notes

 Tracks 20–24 and 26–29 of the digital download track listing can be found as music discs within Minecraft.

Charts

Release history

References 

2013 soundtrack albums
Minecraft